The 2016 Division 1, part of the 2016 Swedish football season , is the 11th season of Sweden's third-tier football league in its current format. The 2016 fixtures were released in December 2015. The season started on 16 April 2016 and ended on 6 November 2016.

Teams
28 teams contest the league separated into two divisions, Norra and Södra. 19 returning from the 2015 season, three relegated from Superettan and six promoted from Division 2. The champion of each division will qualify directly for promotion to Superettan, the two runners-up has to play a play-off against the thirteenth and fourteenth team from Superettan to decide who will play in Superettan 2017. The bottom three teams in each division will qualify directly for relegation to Division 2, while the 11th team from each division has to play a play-off against the best runners-up from Division 2 to avoid relegation.

Stadia and locations

Norra

Södra

 1 Correct as of end of 2015 season

Personnel and kits

League tables

Norra

Södra

Playoffs
The 11th-placed teams of each division meets the best two runners-up from 2016 Division 2 in Two-legged ties on a home-and-away basis with the team from Division 1 finishing at home.

FC Rosengård 1917 won 4–2 on aggregate.

IFK Luleå won 4–2 on aggregate.

Season statistics

Norra top scorers

Södra top scorers

References

Swedish Football Division 1 seasons
3
Sweden
Sweden